Jürgen Hubbert (24 July 1939 – 12 January 2021) was a German mechanical engineer and manager. From 16 December 1998 to 6 April 2005 he was a member of the Board of Management of what was then DaimlerChrysler AG and in this function was responsible for the Mercedes Car Group (MCG).

Life 
After graduating from high school, he studied at the University of Stuttgart and graduated in 1965 with a degree in engineering. In the same year he joined what was then Daimler-Benz AG, where he worked in the process development department of the Sindelfingen plant in various technical and planning functions until 1973. At the beginning of the 90s he accepted a teaching position at the Faculty of Mechanical Engineering at the University of Karlsruhe in addition to his work at Mercedes-Benz.

Daimler Benz 
Jürgen Hubbert headed the Daimler-Benz car business from 1990 and was called Mister Mercedes. During this time, the models on offer were expanded, including the compact cars A-Class and smart, the first SUV with the star M-Class and the CLK.

He played a key role in Mercedes' re-entry into Formula 1 in the early 1990s. Since 2002, Hubbert was President of the Grand Prix World Championship, which wanted to establish its own Grand Prix series from 2008 in competition with Formula 1.

Positions at Daimler-Benz 
 1973: Head of work preparation for the Sindelfingen plant; at the same time planning of the plant construction in Bremen
 1984: Head of the production preparation department in Sindelfingen
 1985: Head of Corporate Planning: Coordination of strategic and medium-term planning for the group and management of the product commissions for passenger cars and commercial vehicles
 1987: Deputy member of the Board of Management, Passenger Car Division, Daimler-Benz AG
 1989: Member of the Board of Management, Passenger Car Division, Mercedes-Benz AG
 1997: Member of the Board of Management, Passenger Car Division, Daimler-Benz AG
 2004: Retirement (successor: Eckhard Cordes)

Cultural and social engagement 
Jürgen Hubbert was the founding chairman of the Sindelfingen Community Foundation. He also bequeathed his stuffed animal collection, consisting of 2500 Steiff stuffed animals, to the city of Sindelfingen. Since no space could be created for this in the city museum by 2020, the exhibits were returned to Jürgen Hubbert.

He was chairman of the board of directors of the State Gallery in Stuttgart and chairman of the board of trustees of the Foundation for the Promotion of the Semperoper. He was a member of the Board of Trustees of Forum Tiberius. At the Deutsche Sporthilfe Foundation, he chaired the Board of Trustees.

Miscellaneous 
 He was a member of the supervisory board of Industriewerke Karlsruhe-Augsburg AG (IWKA).
 He was a member of the group advisory board of Deutsche Bahn.

Awards 
In 2000 Jürgen Hubbert received the Great Silver Medal of Honor with the Star for Services to the Republic of Austria. On 14 December 2004 he was awarded the Order of Merit of the Federal Republic of Germany (Cross of Merit 1st Class). In 2015 the Karlsruhe Institute of Technology awarded him honorary academic citizenship.

1939 births
2021 deaths
Mercedes-Benz Group executives
Mercedes-Benz in Formula One
McLaren people
People from Hagen
Officers Crosses of the Order of Merit of the Federal Republic of Germany